Box Backup is an open-source, completely automatic online backup system. The client software sends the backup data to the server. The  data is encrypted using the Secure Sockets Layer (SSL) protocol and is also protected by a further layer of on-disk encryption.

Box Backup supports Linux, UNIX, Windows, and Mac OS X backup clients and servers (although Windows servers are not recommended by the authors).

Box Backup is licensed under the GNU GPL and BSD licenses.

Introduction
Box Backup is a client-server application in which a client sends data to the server for storage. The server provides management of client via certificates, storage quotas, and data retention. Together, a unique and robust solution is created that scales allowing clients with low-bandwidth connections to effectively perform reliable backups.

Box Backup is ideal for backing up laptops and computers with intermittent or low-bandwidth connections, because it is capable of continuous data protection in the background, starting automatically when an internet connection is present, and recovering gracefully and efficiently from connection failures.

Box Backup uses a modified version of the Rsync algorithm, that works with encrypted blocks. This allows it to store data on the server in a form that the server operator cannot read, while still uploading only changed portions of data files.

References

External links
Box Backup official site

Free software programmed in C++
Free backup software
Backup software for Linux